Nicole Hansen is an American producer, actress, and president of eBrandgelize Digital. She has contributed to Indiewire's Box Office Insider and the Producers Guild of America's Produced by magazine. Her work has been profiled in Ms. In the Biz and My Devotional Thoughts. For her own films, she worked with film festival publicists and produced her then-10-year-old son's public service announcement Save It and also served as a technology liaison to the entertainment industry.

As an actress, she is best known for her role of Mary in American Cyborg: Steel Warrior. She also played Marilyn Monroe in Billy Idol music videos "L.A. Woman" and "Cradle of Love," directed by David Fincher. In 2018, she returned to acting with a part on Chesapeake Shores.

Filmography

As producer

As web publicist

As actor

References

External links

Living people
American film actresses
American film producers
University of North Carolina School of the Arts alumni
American women film producers
1965 births
21st-century American women